Agrilus abjectus is a species of metallic wood-boring beetle in the family Buprestidae. It is found in North America.

References

Further reading

 
 
 
 
 

abjectus
Beetles of North America
Taxa named by George Henry Horn
Beetles described in 1891